Drumfrochar railway station is a railway station located in a residential district in the south-western part of Greenock, Scotland.

Upon exiting the station to the west, one is confronted with panoramic views over the south-west of the town, including Greenock prison.

Opened on 24 May 1998, it is the newest station on the line.

The station is on the site of the Greenock rail accident in 1994.

Services 

Gallery

References

External links

Railway stations in Greenock
Railway stations opened by Railtrack
Railway stations in Great Britain opened in 1998
Railway stations served by ScotRail
SPT railway stations
1998 establishments in Scotland